Cathy Lesurf (born 1953) is a British folk music singer-songwriter who was brought up in Stevenage, Hertfordshire. She has been a member of bands in the 1970s such as Oyster Ceilidh Band, Fiddler's Dram, and The Albion Band. She released a solo album, Surface, in 1985, the same year that she appeared as a guest vocalist on the Fairport Convention album Gladys' Leap. She created and ran the World in 1 County festival from 2002 to 2007. In November 2009, she released the solo single "This Christmas", which was written by her husband, David Wilson.

Discography
Solo singles
"This Christmas" (2009)

Solo albums
Surface (1985)

With Fairport Convention
Gladys' Leap (1985)

With The Albion Band
Live at the Cambridge Folk Festival (1998) (tracks 7 – 11, recorded 1987)
Live in Concert (1993) (tracks 8 – 11, recorded 1982)
The Wild Side Of Town (1987)
Stella Maris (1987)
A Christmas Present from the Albion Band (1985)
Under the Rose (1984)
Light Shining (1983)

With Oyster Band
English Rock 'n' Roll The Early Years 1800–1850 (1982)

With Oyster Ceilidh Band
Jack's Alive (1980)

With Fiddler's Dram
Fiddler's Dram (1980)
To See the Play (1978)

With Wolfscote
Turn the Glass (2015)

References

External links

Living people
People from Stevenage
English folk singers
British folk rock musicians
Musicians from Hertfordshire
The Albion Band members
Oysterband members
1953 births